John James Bell (born 2 March 1891) was an English professional footballer who played as an inside forward in the Football League for Nottingham Forest, Rotherham County, Hartlepools United, South Shields and Grimsby Town.

Personal life 
Bell served in the British Armed Forces during the First World War.

Career statistics

References

1891 births
Military personnel from County Durham
Footballers from South Shields
English footballers
Association football inside forwards
St Bartholomew's F.C. players
Bolton Wanderers F.C. players
Ashfield United F.C. players
Royal Engineers A.F.C. players
Reading F.C. players
Plymouth Argyle F.C. players
Nottingham Forest F.C. players
South Shields F.C. (1889) players
Merthyr Town F.C. players
Grimsby Town F.C. players
Loughborough Corinthians F.C. players
Rotherham County F.C. players
Weymouth F.C. players
Hartlepool United F.C. players
English Football League players
British military personnel of World War I
Year of death unknown
Place of death missing